Cruzeiro is a village located in the middle of Mé-Zóchi District, on São Tomé Island, which is part of the island nation of São Tomé and Príncipe. Its population is 1,716 (2012 census). It lies directly to the south of Trindade.

Population history

Notable person
Francisco Fortunato Pires, National Assembly member from 1994 to 2002

References

Populated places in Mé-Zóchi District